Johnny Vilstrup Pedersen (born 27 February 1967) is a Danish former association footballer, who played for Lyngby and AGF of the Danish Superliga. He moved abroad to play professionally for Luton Town during the 1995–96 season.

Club career
In September 1995 Vilstrup was signed for Luton Town by manager Terry Westley for £175,000. After just seven Football League First Division appearances Westley was sacked and his replacement Lennie Lawrence discarded Vilstrup, who returned to Denmark on loan with AGF. He helped AGF win the 1995–96 Danish Cup and his transfer was made permanent for £100,000 in June 1996. A knee injury sustained in November 1996 prematurely ended Vilstrup's football career.

References

External links
 Johnny Vilstrup at Superstats.dk 
 Johnny Vilstrup at FootballFacts.ru 

1967 births
Living people
Danish men's footballers
Danish expatriate men's footballers
Luton Town F.C. players
English Football League players
Expatriate footballers in England
Danish expatriate sportspeople in England
Danish Superliga players
Association football midfielders
Aarhus Gymnastikforening players
Footballers from Copenhagen
Lyngby Boldklub players